Chetone histriomorpha is a moth of the family Erebidae. It was described by Hering in 1925. It is found in Ecuador.

References

Chetone
Moths described in 1925